Kim Jun-ho (born 9 October 1995) is a South Korean speed skater.

Kim competed at the 2014 Winter Olympics for South Korea. In the 500 metres he finished 21st overall.

Kim won a bronze medal at the 500 m event in the 2013 World Junior Championships.

Kim made his World Cup debut in November 2013. As of September 2014, Kim's top World Cup finish is 15th in a 500 m race at Berlin in 2013–14. His best overall finish in the World Cup is 30th, in the 500 metres in 2013–14.

Education
Korea National Sport University
Kangwon Physical High School
Namchuncheon Middle School
The Attached Elementary School of Chuncheon National University of Education

References

External links

1995 births
South Korean male speed skaters
Speed skaters at the 2014 Winter Olympics
Speed skaters at the 2018 Winter Olympics
Speed skaters at the 2022 Winter Olympics
Olympic speed skaters of South Korea
Speed skaters from Seoul
Living people
Korea National Sport University alumni
World Single Distances Speed Skating Championships medalists
21st-century South Korean people
20th-century South Korean people